King's Record Shop is the sixth studio album by American country music singer Rosanne Cash. It was released on June 26, 1987, her fifth album for the label. The album produced four singles on the Billboard country singles chart. They were  "The Way We Make a Broken Heart", a cover of her father Johnny Cash's "Tennessee Flat Top Box", "If You Change Your Mind", and "Runaway Train". This was the last album in Cash's career to feature Rodney Crowell as the sole record producer, who produced all of her albums since her first Columbia album Right or Wrong in 1980.

The album is named after King's Record Shop in Louisville, Kentucky, which was owned by Pee Wee King's younger brother, Gene. A photograph of Rosanne Cash standing in the shop's doorway is featured on the cover, though she was never actually at the shop for the photo.  Veteran steel guitarist Hank DeVito took the photo of the record shop and one of Rosanne standing as she is in the photo. A picture of Cash's 1981 album Seven Year Ache is shown. He superimposed her into the record shop photo (Music City News magazine, August 1987).

Sony BMG controversially used their XCP technology on the album when it was re-released in 2005 as part of its American Milestones series.

Track listing

CD bonus tracks
<li>"707" (John Kilzer) – 3:34
<li>"Runaway Train" (live) (John Stewart) – 4:17
<li>"Green, Yellow and Red" (live) (John Kilzer) – 5:15

Personnel
Rosanne Cash: vocals, guitar
Rodney Crowell: background vocals
Vince Gill: background vocals
Arnold McCuller: background vocals
Mark O'Connor: mandola
Patty Smyth: background vocals
Benmont Tench: piano, keyboards
Steve Winwood: background vocals
Sterling Ball: acoustic guitar
Eddie Bayers: drums
Barry Beckett: piano, Hammond organ
Larry Crane: acoustic & electric guitar
Anthony Crawford: background vocals
Kristen DeLauer: background vocals
Terry Evans: background vocals
Willie Green, Jr.: background vocals
Bobby King: background vocals
Joann Neal: background vocals
Michael Rhodes: bass guitar, acoustic bass
Vince Santoro: drums
Randy Scruggs: acoustic guitar
Jean Smith: background vocals
Steuart Smith: electric guitar, gut string guitar
Billy Joe Walker Jr.: acoustic & electric guitar

Production
Rodney Crowell: producer   
T-Bone Toglio: assistant producer   
Margie Hunt: production assistant   
Martha Wood: production assistant   
John Agnello: engineer   
Donivan Cowart: engineer   
Jeanne Kinney: engineer   
Steve Marcantonio: engineer, mixing   
Keith Odle: engineer   
Frank Pekoc: engineer   
George Marino: mastering

Charts

Weekly charts

Year-end charts

References
Hall, Wade. Hell-Bent for Music: The Life of Pee Wee King. University Press of Kentucky, 1996.
Music City News magazine, "Seeing Is Deceiving On Cash's New Album", August 1987.

1987 albums
Rosanne Cash albums
Columbia Records albums
Albums produced by Rodney Crowell